Borinquen Alfredo Marrero Ríos (August 8, 1898 – December 3, 1962) was a Puerto Rican judge. He served for 10 years as an Associate Justice of the Supreme Court of Puerto Rico.
Judge Borinquen Marrero Rios
Born on August 5, 1899 in Naguabo, Puerto Rico, he obtained his bachelors and law degrees at the Fordham University School of Law.  While a law student, he worked as a Spanish and English language correspondent.

Worked in the legal private practice until 1947 when he was appointed to the Puerto Rican Supreme Court by President Harry S. Truman in 1947 until 1957.

He died on 3 December 1962, in Madrid, Spain, at the age of 63.

Sources 
La Justicia en sus Manos by Luis Rafael Rivera, 

1898 births
1962 deaths
20th-century American judges
Associate Justices of the Supreme Court of Puerto Rico
Fordham University School of Law alumni
People from Naguabo, Puerto Rico
Puerto Rican judges